Sky Sports Racing (formerly  At The Races) is a British pay television channel devoted to horse racing. A joint venture between Sky Group and Arena Racing Company, it broadcasts coverage of domestic, European and international horse racing events.

In January 2019, after previously operating autonomously from its sisters, the channel was re-launched as part of the Sky Sports family of channels.

History 

It was originally launched on 1 May 2002 as Attheraces, a partnership between the aforementioned entities plus Channel Four Television Corporation. It stopped broadcasting on 29 March 2004 due to financial problems but, after restructuring, was relaunched on 11 June 2004 without Channel Four.

On 30 April 2018, it was announced that At The Races would be relaunched as part of the larger Sky Sports portfolio as Sky Sports Racing by the end of the year. With the relaunch, the channel will have wider distribution within Sky Sports' packages, and availability on mobiles through Sky Go. The rebranding occurred 1 January 2019. In April 2018 it was announced Chester Race Company had signed a 10 year deal to bring Live Racing from Bangor-On-Dee and Chester to Sky Sports Racing from March 2019 In July 2018, it was also announced that beginning also in March 2019, it would also hold rights to Ascot. The "At The Races" brand name however, remains in use as a website and on the channel's Twitter page, complete with a new logo.

Programming
The channel starts broadcasting at 9am every day. In the mornings on the hour, Racing News is shown, followed by reviews of previous days racing. This format is repeated several times and updated with interviews. Presenters change over in the early afternoon and the lead presenter is joined by a guest to discuss the afternoon's racing.  Until 1 January 2019, it was produced at the SIS broadcast facility in Milton Keynes. It is now produced from the newly automated Studio G at Sky Campus in Isleworth.

Racing Review
The Racing Debate 
Get In
Raceday Live
Sky Sports Racing Stateside
Australian Racing

Presenters
Robert 'Sir Bob' Cooper – On-course reporter
Sean 'Boycie' Boyce – Studio presenter 
Matt Chapman – Studio presenter and on-course reporter. Also works for ITV Racing
Darrell Williams – Studio presenter
Anthony 'Enzo' Ennis – Studio presenter and commentator
Luke Harvey – Occasional studio work (mainly Get In! (with Jason Weaver) and on-course reporter. Also works for ITV racing
John Hunt – Studio presenter (also BBC Radio 5Live commentator)
Simon Mapletoft – Occasional studio presenter and on-course reporter
Jason Weaver – Studio presenter and on-course reporter. Also works for ITV racing 
Mike Cattermole – Studio presenter and commentator. Occasional on-course reporter (was also formerly a presenter for Channel 4 Racing)
Zoey Bird – On-course reporter
Alex Hammond – Studio presenter and on-course reporter
Derek 'Tommo' Thompson – Studio presenter (was also formerly a presenter/commentator for Channel 4 Racing) and race commentator 
Hayley Moore - On-course reporter, younger sister of Ryan Moore
Aly Vance - Studio presenter
Kieran O'Sullivan - Studio presenter
Hayley Turner - Jockey
Martin Kelly – Studio presenter and occasional on-course reporter
Jim McGrath – Reporter (was also formerly the BBC's main commentator)
Mick Fitzgerald – On-Course reporter. Also works for ITV Racing
Gina Bryce – Studio presenter and on-course reporter (was also formerly a presenter for Channel 4 Racing)
Tim Caroll - Studio presenter
John Blance - Studio presenter and race commentator
Vanessa Ryle - On-course reporter
Leonna Mayor - On-course reporter

Courses
The partner racecourses are:

Ascot
Bangor-on-Dee
Bath
Brighton
Chepstow
Chester
Doncaster
Ffos Las
Fontwell
Great Yarmouth
Hereford
Hexham
Lingfield Park
Newcastle
Newton Abbot
Plumpton
Ripon
Sedgefield
Southwell
Towcester
Uttoxeter
Windsor
Wolverhampton
Worcester

References

External links
AtTheRaces.com

SkySports.com/Racing

Horse racing mass media in the United Kingdom
Horse racing mass media
Sky Sports
Sky television channels
Television channels and stations established in 2002
Sports television channels in the United Kingdom
Sports television in the United Kingdom
2002 establishments in the United Kingdom
Reuben Brothers